Mardan Medical Complex (MMC) is a major healthcare facility located in the city of Mardan, Khyber Pakhtunkhwa, Pakistan. The complex is a public-private partnership between the government of Khyber Pakhtunkhwa and the Mardan Medical Complex Private Limited.

The complex was established in 2008 and consists of a 500-bed tertiary care hospital, a medical college, and a nursing school. The medical college offers undergraduate and postgraduate programs in medicine, nursing, and other healthcare disciplines.

See also
 Bacha Khan Medical Complex Swabi

References

Hospitals in Khyber Pakthunkhwa